Sega Rally is a series of racing video games published by Sega and developed by several studios including Sega AM3, Sega and Sega Racing Studio.

The series released its first title, Sega Rally Championship in 1994. Initially, Sega Rally Championship was exclusive to arcade genre. The titles consist of racing with different cars on various tracks.

Installments 
There have been five games released in the Sega Rally series. Two games were developed by Sega AM3, one was developed by Sega, and two were developed by Sega Racing Studio. The original game, designed by Tetsuya Mizuguchi, was released on the Model 2 board and became very popular in the arcades, later receiving a port to the Sega Saturn.

This port was of excellent quality and looked much better than PlayStation racing games of the same era. It ran in smooth 30 frames per second (25 fps on European PAL systems) and looked very much like the arcade original. Exceptions included non-transparent windows since the Saturn could not generate transparencies in 3D graphics, draw distance shorter than in the arcade game, and lower resolution. A Windows port using on DirectX followed about one year later. The biggest difference between the original and its home versions is the option to drive three laps on each of the four implemented tracks instead of only one lap. Good players could also unlock an extra car: the Lancia Stratos.

Sega Rally Championship 2 was released on the Model 3 board and was ported to Dreamcast in November 1998, making it one of the first Japanese Dreamcast games available. However, the Dreamcast version suffered from an unstable frame rate and wasn't as successful as its predecessor. The arcade original featured only four courses, while the port had between one and three courses for each of the five implemented environments, all wrapped up in a 10-year championship. Again, a PC port followed. Sega Rally Championship 2 on DC and PC featured a lot of tuning options for the cars, including choice of tires and suspension, which could not be found in the arcades.

Sega Rally 3 was released in 2008 and is a condensed version of Sega Rally Revo for Xbox 360, PS3 and PC. This time the port went the other way around. Sega Rally 3 was released as Sega Rally Online Arcade for Xbox 360 and PS3 in 2011 and came full circle from consoles to arcades and back again.

Released titles 

 The first year for arcade, the second for home console or PC 
 Released only in Japan and South Korea 
 Not released in Japan

References

External links
Official website (Japanese)

Sega Games franchises
Rally racing video games
Video game franchises introduced in 1994